This is a list of films produced in the Netherlands during the 1910s. The films are produced in the Dutch language.

1910s
Films
Dutch